Hatchment may refer to:
Hatchment (heraldic achievement), a full display of all the heraldic components to which the bearer of a coat of arms is entitled
Funerary hatchment, a depiction within a black lozenge-shaped frame of a deceased's heraldic achievement